Sanningassorsuaq Peninsula (old spelling: Sáningassorssuaq) is a mainland peninsula in northwestern Greenland, located at the northern end of Upernavik Archipelago.

Geography 

The peninsula has a west–east orientation, jutting into Inussulik Bay to the west. It is separated from the Kiatassuaq and Milissua islands in the north by the narrow Ikerasaa Strait. In the south, the innermost inlet of Inussulik Bay full of icebergs calved by the Illullip Sermia glacier separates the peninsula from the Illulissuaq Peninsula.

Promontories

References 

Inussulik Bay
Peninsulas of the Upernavik Archipelago